Rangpur army Medical College (RAMC) is a military medical school, established in 2014. It is located within Rangpur Cantonment, in Rangpur, Bangladesh. It is affiliated with Bangladesh University of Professionals. Academic activities began in January 2015 with 50 students.

It offers a five-year course of study leading to a Bachelor of Medicine, Bachelor of Surgery (MBBS) degree. A one-year internship after graduation is compulsory for all graduates. The degree is recognised by the Bangladesh Medical and Dental Council.

The college has one male dormitory, three female dormitory.

References

External links
 

Medical colleges in Bangladesh
Hospitals in Bangladesh
Educational institutions established in 2014
2014 establishments in Bangladesh
Military education and training in Bangladesh